Carl Reuterskiöld (May 5, 1923 - March 20, 2006; known to his associates as Charlie) was the founding CEO of the Belgium-based Society for Worldwide Interbank Financial Telecommunication (SWIFT), a position which he held for a decade from SWIFT's founding in 1973 until 1983.

Career

Prior to SWIFT
Before leading SWIFT, Carl Reuterskiöld was Vice President of the International banking and card division for Systems and Communications worldwide at American Express.

SWIFT
Carl Reuterskiöld was the founding CEO of SWIFT from 1973 onwards. Founded by 239 banks from 15 countries, SWIFT was a cooperative that sought to transition the long distance interbank messaging from the slow, manual and insecure telex system of the day toward a more reliable and automated messaging system.  In 1976 he oversaw the opening of SWIFT's first operating centres. In 1979 he inaugurated SWIFT's United States Operating Centre in Virginia, in conjunction with the then state Governor of Virginia, John N. Dalton. In 1982 he announced that SWIFT had finally achieved financial stability and welcomed Banque Nationale de Belgique as the 1000th member of SWIFT. He retired in 1983.

Private life
Carl Reuterskiöld lived in La Hulpe, Belgium and Virginia, United States.

Mr. Reuterskiöld died peacefully on 20 March 2006 at the age of 82.

See also
Society for Worldwide Interbank Financial Telecommunication

References

2006 deaths
Belgian bankers
Year of birth uncertain
Society for Worldwide Interbank Financial Telecommunication
1923 births